The 1986 Atlantic 10 men's basketball tournament was played from February 25 to March 3, 1986. The tournament was played at the Brendan Bryne Arena in East Rutherford, NJ.  The winner was named champion of the Atlantic 10 Conference and received an automatic bid to the 1986 NCAA Men's Division I Basketball Tournament. Saint Joseph's University won the tournament. Greg Mullee of Saint Joseph's was named the tournament's Most Outstanding Player. Saint Joseph's, Temple, and West Virginia earned bids to the NCAA Tournament in 1986.

Bracket

External links
  Atlantic 10 Men's Basketball Tournament History 

Atlantic 10 men's basketball tournament
Tournament
Atlantic 10 men's basketball tournament
Atlantic 10 men's basketball tournament
Atlantic 10 men's basketball tournament